Nashville Public Library is the public library serving Nashville, Tennessee and the metropolitan area of Davidson County. In 2010, the Nashville Public Library was the recipient of the National Medal for Museum and Library Service. The library was named the Gale/Library Journal 2017 Library of the Year.

History

A succession of public libraries, known by a variety of names, served the people of Nashville. The early libraries were generally small, offered a narrow range of services, and operated on a fee schedule. In 1897, the Tennessee General Assembly authorized cities of a certain size to establish and maintain free public libraries and reading rooms. With this authority, in 1901 the Howard Library became Nashville’s first free circulating library. Also in 1901, Andrew Carnegie offered to donate $100,000 for a new library building if the city would take care of its maintenance. The city accepted those terms, and in 1904, the Carnegie Library Building was completed on Polk Avenue. Andrew Carnegie enabled the building and opening of an additional three branches between 1912 and 1919. Two of those buildings are still in use today, the North Branch and the East Branch.

The Carnegie Library Building was razed and replaced with the Ben West Public Library in 1963. The Main Library was housed in the Ben West building for 38 years.

The new Main Library Building, designed by Robert A.M. Stern Architects, was opened in 2001. Previously on the site for the Main Library was a downtown shopping mall called Church Street Center.

Branches

There are 20 library branches in the Nashville Public Library system. They are:

 Bellevue Branch Library
 Bordeaux Branch Library
 Donelson Branch Library
 East Branch Library
 Edgehill Branch Library
 Edmondson Pike Branch Library
 Goodlettsville Branch Library
 Green Hills Branch Library
 Hadley Park Branch Library
 Hermitage Branch Library
 Inglewood Branch Library
 Looby Branch Library
 Madison Branch Library
 North Branch Library
 Old Hickory Branch Library
 Pruitt Branch Library
 Richland Park Branch Library
 Southeast Branch Library
 Thompson Lane Branch Library
 Watkins Park Branch Library

Programs and services
The Nashville Public Library features a variety of public programming. The library offers puppet shows in the Main Library as well as throughout the Nashville community.

The library offers digital collections, e-book and audiobook downloads, language learning services, and computer classes. There are a variety of book clubs hosted throughout the library system.

In 2010, the Nashville Public Library began partnering with Metropolitan Nashville Public Schools to offer the students access to the public library materials. Called "Limitless Libraries," this program offers access to approximately 1.5 million information resources.

The Main Library's Special Collections Division contains several archival and oral history collections highlighting Nashville history. Among them, the Civil Rights Room, documenting the Civil Rights Movement in Nashville, and an oral history collection documenting the 2010 Tennessee floods in Nashville.

Portraits

The library includes many portraits of Tennesseans, including former mayor and Confederate veteran Randal William McGavock.

Friends of the Library and Library Foundation 

Friends of the Nashville Public Library is a non-profit that offers memberships and supports the library through book sales. The Friends of the Nashville Public Library offer support for the summer reading program as well other programs and collection development.

The Nashville Public Library Foundation is a non-profit founded in 1997 to raise funds for the Nashville Public Library. Depending on private donors, the Nashville Public Library Foundation offers funds for various programs, services, and building improvements in the library system. These include funding of the Bringing Books to Life pre-school literacy program, the Special Collections' Civil Rights Room, and $5 million in collection development funds.

On December 2, 2015, The Nashville Public Library unveiled the new Kidman-Urban Puppet Stage in the children's section of the library, made possible by a donation from Nicole Kidman and Keith Urban, long time supporters of the library.

References

External links
 Library website

Further reading
 

Public libraries in Tennessee
Libraries in Tennessee
Robert A. M. Stern buildings
Library buildings completed in 2001